Bostançı (also, Bostanchy) is a village and municipality in the Khachmaz Rayon of Azerbaijan.  It has a population of 1,688.  The municipality consists of the villages of Bostançı, Hacıəbdürəhimoba, and Sibiroba.

References 

Populated places in Khachmaz District